Naudain is a surname. Notable people with the surname include:

Arnold Naudain (1790–1872), American physician and politician
May Naudain (1880–1923), American actress and singer

See also
Naudin

English-language surnames